Stéphane Tchalgadjieff is an Armenian film producer and director who worked mostly in France, who was born on 9 August 1942 in Bulgaria. He founded several motion picture companies: Sunchild productions (1971–1981), Sunshine (1995) and the Solaris (2002–present).

He studied anthropology at Columbia University and New York University. He produced movies for, among others, Robert Bresson, Michelangelo Antonioni, Jacques Rivette and Marguerite Duras. He worked with a line producer: Danièle Gégauff, former actress for Claude Chabrol.

Filmography 
Eros by Michelangelo Antonioni, Steven Soderbergh, Wong Kar-Wai (2004)
Le Chien, le Général et les Oiseaux by Francis Nielsen (animated film) (2003)
Par-delà les nuages by Michelangelo Antonioni and Wim Wenders (1995)
Merry-Go-Round by Jacques Rivette (1981)
Deux lions au soleil by Claude Faraldo (1980)
Le Soleil en face by Pierre Kast (1980)
Une femme au bout de la nuit by Daniel Daërt (1980)
Le maître-nageur by Jean-Louis Trintignant (1979)
Fidelio by Pierre Jourdan (1979)
Le Diable probablement by Robert Bresson (1977)
Aïda by Pierre Jourdan (1977)
Baxter, Vera Baxter by Marguerite Duras (1977)
Duelle (une quarantine) by Jacques Rivette (1976)
L'assassin musicien by Benoît Jacquot (1976)
Noroît by Jacques Rivette (1976)
India Song by Marguerite Duras (1975)
La Femme du Gange by Marguerite Duras (1974)
Out 1 (noli me tangere) by Jacques Rivette (1971)
Paris vu par... by Claude Chabrol, Jean Rouch, Jean Douchet, Jean-Luc Godard, Jean-Daniel Pollet (1965) (production assistant)

References

External links

1942 births
Living people
French film producers
French film directors
People from Plovdiv
Bulgarian emigrants to France